The Volgograd Oblast Duma is the regional parliament of Volgograd Oblast, a federal subject of Russia. A total of 38 deputies are elected for five-year terms.

Elections

2014

2019

Notes

References

Volgograd Oblast
Politics of Volgograd Oblast